Khaneh Miran may refer to:
 Khaneh Miran, Kurdistan
 Khaneh Miran, Markazi